Charles Ogilvie (born 18 January 1942) is a Jamaican sailor. He competed in the Dragon event at the 1968 Summer Olympics.

References

External links
 

1942 births
Living people
Jamaican male sailors (sport)
Olympic sailors of Jamaica
Sailors at the 1968 Summer Olympics – Dragon
Place of birth missing (living people)